XHAZE-FM is a radio station on 104.3 FM in Nogales, Sonora. The station is known as La Sonora de Nogales and carries a grupera format.

History
XHAZE received its concession on October 5, 1994.

References

Radio stations in Sonora
Radio stations established in 1997
1997 establishments in Mexico